Dead Birds may refer to:

 Dead Birds (1964 film), a documentary film by Robert Gardner
 Dead Birds (2004 film), an American horror film directed by Alex Turner

See also
 Dead Bird (disambiguation)